Phyllonorycter mida is a moth of the family Gracillariidae. It is found in eastern Kenya and Yemen. The habitat consists of coastal areas of the Indian Ocean.

The length of the forewings is 1.82–2.07 mm. The forewing is elongate and the ground colour is bronze ochreous with white markings. The hindwings are pale beige with a silver lustre. Adults are on wing in late March and early April.

Etymology
The name of this species is formed from the name of the locality Mida Creek.

References

Moths described in 2012
mida
Moths of Africa
Moths of the Middle East

Taxa named by Jurate de Prins
Lepidoptera of Kenya